

American Beach is a locality in South Australia on the north coast of Dudley Peninsula on Kangaroo Island overlooking Nepean Bay, about  south-west of Adelaide.

The name is derived from the nearby beach of the same name. The locality is zoned for conservation purposes with the view of providing limited built development intended principally for tourism uses, which has a minimal impact and where provided, complements the environment of the locality.

The gazetted locality boundaries were created in March 2002. As of 2015, it consists of a strip of land located between the coastline with Nepean Bay and the Hog Bay Road. It is “not to be confused with the former American Beach Estate subdivision” which was also gazetted in 2002 as Baudin Beach.

The 2016 Australian census which was conducted in August 2016 reports that American Beach had a population of 6 people.

American Beach is located within the federal division of Mayo, the state electoral district of Mawson and the local government area of the Kangaroo Island Council.

References

Towns on Kangaroo Island
Dudley Peninsula
Coastal towns in South Australia
Australian places named after U.S. places or U.S. history